Stephen Shane Parry (born 31 October 1960) is an Australian politician who was a Liberal Party senator for Tasmania from 2005 to 2017. He was elected President of the Senate in 2014. On 31 October 2017, Parry informed the government that he may be a British citizen, and issued his intention to resign from his position if dual nationality was confirmed. The next day he reported that he had received confirmation of his dual citizenship and, on 2 November, he resigned as president and from the Senate. He was replaced in the Senate by next Liberal Party Tasmanian Senate candidate and former senator Richard Colbeck after a recount.

Early life
Parry was born on 31 October 1960 in Burnie, Tasmania, to William Stephen ("Bill") Parry (1940–2015) and Patricia Dawn Evans;  his father had been born in Liverpool, UK and had emigrated to Australia in the 1950s. He was educated at Burnie's Marist Regional College, after which he enrolled at the Tasmania Police Academy in Hobart.

Career
Parry was employed as an officer with the Tasmanian Police from 1977 to 1986, and was promoted to detective in 1983. After leaving the police force, he completed a certificate in Mortuary Science at the Australian College of Funeral Service, and was a funeral director from 1986 to 2004, becoming president of the Australian Funeral Directors Association.

Parry performed a significant role in the wake of the 1996 Port Arthur massacre, acting as the Team Leader of the Embalming Team. Parry was also president of the Burnie Chamber of Commerce and Industry from 2000 to 2004, and a director of the Tasmanian Chamber of Commerce and Industry from 2000 to 2005.

Politics
In 2004, Parry was elected to the Australian Senate for the state of Tasmania as a member of the Liberal Party of Australia. He was elected government deputy whip in the Senate in November 2006 and government whip in April 2007 in succession to the late Senator Jeannie Ferris.

Senator Parry was elected opposition whip after the 2007 federal election, and on 16 February 2009, in addition to his role as whip, he was appointed manager of opposition business in the Senate.

On 4 July 2011, Parry was elected by the Senate as the deputy president and chairman of committees, replacing Alan Ferguson. On 7 July 2014, the Senate elected him as its president.

On 31 October 2017, Parry informed the government he believed he may be a British citizen through descent, which would disqualify him from sitting in Parliament under Section 44 of the Constitution. The next day he confirmed he did indeed hold dual British-Australian citizenship and announced he would be resigning as senate president and Senator for Tasmania on 2 November 2017.

Upon the election of his successor, there was all-party praise for Parry's performance as President.

Parry's senate position was filled by Richard Colbeck who was sworn in on 12 February 2018.

Post-politics
In 2019, Parry was appointed to the Administrative Appeals Tribunal as a part-time member with an initial term of seven years.

References

External links
 Stephen Parry, Senate Biography
 Summary of parliamentary voting for Senator Stephen Parry on TheyVoteForYou.org.au

1960 births
Living people
Liberal Party of Australia members of the Parliament of Australia
Members of the Australian Senate
Members of the Australian Senate for Tasmania
Presidents of the Australian Senate
Australian police officers
Funeral directors
People from Burnie, Tasmania
21st-century Australian politicians
Australian people of British descent